The Battle of Laon (9–10 March 1814) was the victory of Blücher's Prussian army over Napoleon's French army near Laon. During the Battle of Craonne on 7 March, Blücher's army was forced to retreat into Laon after a failed attempt to halt Napoleon's east flank. Along the way to Laon, reinforcements from Russian forces under Ferdinand von Wintzingerode and a Prussian corps led by Friedrich Wilhelm Freiherr von Bülow joined the defensive. Blücher opted to face Napoleon at Laon because it was the site of a strategically important road junction, and because of its highly defensible position.

Prelude
An Allied coalition attempted to complete the destruction of Napoleon's French Empire in 1814. France had been defeated in Russia in 1812 and in Central Europe in 1813. Napoleon's French Empire was now fighting for its survival.

In the last week of February 1814, about a month after the start of the Allied invasion, Blücher seized the initiative and advanced on Paris with his forces. Napoleon's two marshals in the immediate vicinity, Édouard Mortier and Auguste Marmont, were covering the city with two detached corps, but they only had 10,000 men and would be unable to hold out against Blücher's larger force. Napoleon hurried westwards to their rescue with around 30,000 troops, hoping to trap Blücher against the river Marne.

Blücher unsuccessfully attacked Marmont and Mortier along the river Ourcq in late February and early March and ordered a retreat north to regroup when he heard of Napoleon's advance. Prussian troops crossed the swollen river Aisne and arrived at Soissons on 4 March. There they linked up with reinforcements that brought Blücher's total force to 100,000. On 7 March, a clash ensued at the Battle of Craonne as Napoleon attacked westwards along the Chemin des Dames (literally, the "ladies' road"). Blücher's outflanking maneuver did not materialize in time and the Prussians were forced to withdraw towards Laon.

Battlefield 
Blücher chose to fight at Laon because it was an important road junction with a superb defensive position. Laon was located on a flat-topped hill with steep slopes that rose 330 feet above the surrounding area. The countryside to the north was flat and open, but the south contained rough and wooded terrain that made military maneuvers difficult. The villages of Ardon and Semilly at the foot of the hill served as good bastions for the Prussian and Russian forces.

Preparations
Blücher now had about 90,000 troops and 176 guns. Friedrich Wilhelm Freiherr von Bülow's Prussian corps was assigned the defense of Laon itself. Blücher's western wing was covered by a Russian corps under Ferdinand von Wintzingerode while the eastern wing was defended by two Prussian corps under Generals Yorck and Kleist. Two Russian corps under Generals Langeron and Osten-Sacken stood in reserve. After Craonne, Napoleon had taken the bulk of his forces northeastwards towards Laon while detaching about 10,000 troops under Marmont to advance on Laon via the Berry-au-Bac road.

Battle

Preliminary fighting on the evening of 8 March saw the French vanguard chase off a small Russian detachment from the village of Urcel on the Soissons road. In the early hours of 9 March, the French renewed their push along the road. At 5:30 AM, French dragoons arrived in front of Laon, but had lost the element of surprise and withdrew under heavy fire. From 7:00 AM onwards, the French repeatedly attacked the Allied positions at Ardon and Semilly. Some troops from the Young Guard even reached the top of the hill before being driven back.

Blücher was suffering from a fever and could not direct affairs as closely as he was accustomed during previous engagements. By 11:00 AM, however, the fog had lifted and the Allied command staff had a clear view of the battlefield below. Blücher, because of poor intelligence sources, was operating under the impression that the French had 90,000 troops and was generally reluctant to have his troops launch any attacks. The Allies might have scored a decisive victory had they launched a full attack against Napoleon's 30,000 men, but the uncertainty about the situation led Blücher to commit only Winzingerode's corps against Napoleon's left flank. Winzingerode's attacks were feeble and easily repulsed by the French.

Blücher now decided to isolate Napoleon's western forces from Marmont's column to the east. A convincing Allied attack captured the village of Ardon, but the victorious Prussian infantry brigade was ordered to halt because Blücher feared that French forces to the east would outflank them. Renewed French assaults late in the evening of the 9th captured Clacy, a village on Blücher's western flank. By the end of the first day of fighting, however, Laon still remained in Allied hands.

Meanwhile, at around 5:00 PM on 9 March, Marmont's troops had attacked the village of Athies and driven off the Prussian advanced units. Marmont then sent 1,000 men under Colonel Charles Nicolas Fabvier westwards to establish contact with Napoleon's main army. Blücher and Gneisenau (Blücher's chief-of-staff) heard the fighting to the east and ordered a powerful counter-attack with two corps. The Allies slammed into Marmont's troops and drove them back. Marmont was saved by Colonel Fabvier, who on his own initiative returned with his 1,000 troops to clear the road, and by 125 veterans of the Old Guard, who repelled the Allied cavalry trying to block the French from escaping. Marmont had taken a bad beating, losing 3,500 men and 45 guns.

At midnight on the 10th, Blücher decided on a bold outflanking maneuver intended to crush the French. He was even more ill on the 10th (Gneisenau was effectively in command), but the army still defended Laon. A few more French attacks throughout the day produced no results, and Napoleon retired his forces late at night.

Aftermath
This setback did not by itself spell the end for Napoleon. Just a few days later, the French crushed an isolated enemy corps at Reims. Blücher's Army of Silesia remained inactive for a week after the victory. Nevertheless, the Allied stand had prevented Napoleon from driving them further north. The Allies were still in a position to advance on Paris, which they did at the end of March.

Notes

References

External links

Battles of the War of the Sixth Coalition
Battles of the Napoleonic Wars
Battles involving France
Battles involving Prussia
Battles involving Russia
Conflicts in 1814
March 1814 events
1814 in France